Las Araucarias Airport is an airport  east of Puerto Octay, a town on the northern shore of Llanquihue Lake in the Los Lagos Region of Chile.

The runway has  of grass overrun available on the north end.

See also

Transport in Chile
List of airports in Chile

References

External links
OpenStreetMap - Las Araucarias
OurAirports - Las Araucarias
FallingRain - Las Araucarias Airport

Airports in Chile
Airports in Los Lagos Region